Sumatriptan, sold commonly under  brand names Imitrex and Treximet among others, is a medication used to treat migraine headaches and cluster headaches. It is taken orally, intranasally, or by subcutaneous injection. Therapeutic effects generally occur within three hours.

Its primary effect as a serotonin 5-HT1B/1D receptor agonist can create common side effects such as chest pressure, fatigue, vomiting, tingling, and vertigo. Serious side effects may include serotonin syndrome, heart attacks, strokes, and seizures. With excessive use, medication overuse headaches may occur. It is unclear if use during pregnancy or breastfeeding is safe. The mechanism of action not entirely clear. It is in the triptan class of medications.

Sumatriptan was patented in 1982 and approved for medical use in 1991. It is on the World Health Organization's List of Essential Medicines. It is available as a generic medication. In 2020, it was the 111th most commonly prescribed medication in the United States, with more than 5million prescriptions. It is also available as the combination product sumatriptan/naproxen.

Medical uses
Sumatriptan is effective for ending or relieving the intensity of migraine and cluster headaches. It is most effective when taken early after the start of the pain. Injected sumatriptan is more effective than other formulations.

Oral sumatriptan can be used also in the treatment of post-dural puncture headache.

Adverse effects
Overdose of sumatriptan can cause sulfhemoglobinemia, a rare condition in which the blood changes from red to green, due to the integration of sulfur into the hemoglobin molecule. If sumatriptan is discontinued, the condition reverses within a few weeks.

Serious cardiac events, including some that have been fatal, have occurred following the use of sumatriptan injection or tablets. Events reported have included coronary artery vasospasm, transient myocardial ischemia, myocardial infarction, ventricular tachycardia, and ventricular fibrillation.

The most common side effects reported by at least 2% of patients in controlled trials of sumatriptan (25-, 50-, and 100-mg tablets) for migraine are atypical sensations (paresthesias and warm/cold sensations) reported by 4% in the placebo group and 5–6% in the sumatriptan groups, pain and other pressure sensations (including chest pain) reported by 4% in the placebo group and 6–8% in the sumatriptan groups, neurological events (vertigo) reported by less than 1% in the placebo group and less than 1% to 2% in the sumatriptan groups. Malaise/fatigue occurred in less than 1% of the placebo group and 2–3% of the sumatriptan groups. Sleep disturbance occurred in less than 1% in the placebo group to 2% in the sumatriptan group.

Mechanism of action

Sumatriptan is molecularly similar to serotonin (5-HT), and is a 5-HT receptor (types 5-HT1D and 5-HT1B) agonist. Sumatriptan's primary therapeutic effect is related in its inhibition of the release of Calcitonin gene-related peptide (CGRP), likely through its 5-HT1D/1B receptor-agonist action. This has been substantiated by the efficacy of more recently developed CGRP targeting drugs and antibodies developed for the preventive treatment of migraine. How agonism of the 5-HT1D/1B receptors inhibits CGRP release is not fully understood. CGRP is believed to cause sensitization of trigeminal nociceptive neurons, contributing to the pain experienced in migraine.

Sumatriptan is also shown to decrease the activity of the trigeminal nerve, which presumably accounts for sumatriptan's efficacy in treating cluster headaches. The injectable form of the drug has been shown to abort a cluster headache within 30 minutes in 77% of cases.

Pharmacokinetics
Sumatriptan is administered in several forms: tablets, subcutaneous injection, and nasal spray. Oral administration (as succinate salt) has low bioavailability, partly due to presystemic metabolism—some of it gets broken down in the stomach and bloodstream before it reaches the target arteries. A rapid-release tablet formulation with the same bioavailability but a high concentration can achieve therapeutic effects on average 10–15 minutes earlier than other oral forumulations. When injected, sumatriptan is faster-acting (usually within 10 minutes), but the effect lasts for a shorter time. Sumatriptan is metabolised primarily by monoamine oxidase A into 2-{5-[(methylsulfamoyl)methyl]-indole-3-yl}acetic acid, which is then conjugated to glucuronic acid. These metabolites are excreted in the urine and bile. Only about 3% of the active drug may be recovered unchanged.

There is no simple, direct relationship between sumatriptan concentration (pharmacokinetics) per se in the blood and its anti-migraine effect (pharmacodynamics). This paradox has, to some extent, been resolved by comparing the rates of absorption of the various sumatriptan formulations, rather than the absolute amounts of drug that they deliver.

History

In 1991, Glaxo received approval for sumatriptan, which was the first available triptan.

In July 2009, the US FDA approved a single-use jet injector formulation of sumatriptan. The device delivers a subcutaneous injection of sumatriptan, without the use of a needle. Autoinjectors with needles have been previously available in Europe and North America.

Phase III studies with an iontophoretic transdermal patch (Zelrix/Zecuity) started in July 2008. This patch uses low voltage controlled by a pre-programmed microchip to deliver a single dose of sumatriptan through the skin within 30 minutes. Zecuity was approved by the US FDA in January 2013. Sales of Zecuity have been stopped following reports of skin burns and irritation.

Society and culture

Legal status 
In the United States, it is available only by medical prescription. It is available over the counter in many states in Australia. The product requires labelling by a pharmacist and is only available in packs of two without a medical prescription. However, it can be bought over the counter in the UK and Sweden.

In Russia versions of sumatriptan, which are not registered in the National registry of medications, may be regarded as narcotic drugs (derivatives of dimethyltriptamine).

Generics
Glaxo patents for sumatriptan expired in February 2009. At that time, Imitrex sold for about $25 a pill. Par Pharmaceutical then introduced generic versions of sumatriptan injection (sumatriptan succinate injection) 4- and 6-mg starter kits and 4- and 6-mg filled syringe cartridges, and 6-mg vials soon after.

Mylan Laboratories Inc., Ranbaxy Laboratories, Sandoz (a subsidiary of Novartis), Dr. Reddy's Laboratories, and other companies have been producing generic versions of sumatriptan tablets in 25-, 50-, and 100-mg doses. Generic forms of the drug are available in U.S. and European markets after Glaxo's patent protections expired in the respective countries. A nasal spray form of sumatriptan known as AVP-825 has been developed by Avanir and is generically available in some countries.

Controversy 
According to the American Headache Society, "Patients frequently state that they have difficulty accessing triptans prescribed to them." In the U.S. triptans cost from $12 to $120 each, and more than 80% of U.S. health insurance plans place a limit on the amount of pills available to a patient per month, which has been called "arbitrary and unfair."

References

External links 
 

Triptans
5-HT1B agonists
5-HT1D agonists
5-HT1F agonists
Pfizer brands
GSK plc brands
World Health Organization essential medicines
Wikipedia medicine articles ready to translate
Sulfonamides
Dimethylamino compounds